The Buffalo Turkey Trot is an annual 8K (4.97 miles) Thanksgiving footrace held in Buffalo, New York each Thanksgiving Day. The Buffalo Turkey Trot, a popular fundraiser for the local branch of the YMCA, runs five miles down Delaware Avenue in Buffalo.

History
The race proclaims itself to be the oldest continually running public footrace in North America, having established itself in 1896 and run every year since, even during World War I, the 1918 flu pandemic, World War II, and the 2020 coronavirus pandemic.

The Around the Bay Road Race in nearby Hamilton, Ontario, first run in 1894, also claims the title of Oldest Long-Distance Road Race in North America, although that race was not held during World War I, a ten-year stretch between 1925 and 1935, or in 2020 or 2021. Likewise, the Bemis Forslund Pie Race, the oldest footrace of any distance on the continent, has been held since 1891, but was canceled  in 1936 due to a scarlet fever epidemic, and thus the Buffalo Turkey Trot has had the longer continuous run. It is a mere five months older than the Boston Marathon, launched April 1897.

The Turkey Trot has increased in popularity in recent years. In 1981, the race drew slightly over 1,000 runners. By 1986, the field had doubled in size to 2,000 runners. It drew a crowd of 12,500 runners (the maximum the YMCA would allow) for the 2010 race, resulting in the YMCA arranging to increase capacity and accommodate 13,200 runners in 2011, which also maxed out several days before Thanksgiving. The race again filled the expanded 14,000-runner field over a week before Thanksgiving in 2012.

For the 2020 event, the YMCA reduced the field to 125 runners, but added a virtual race that will allow other participants to choose any 8-kilometer path of their choosing during Thanksgiving weekend; the limited field allowed the race to continue to claim a continuous streak of operations, while at the same time maintaining social distancing during the coronavirus pandemic.

The race is partially a serious competition and partially a fun run; participants in the Turkey Trot have been known to wear unusual costumes (comparable to those used by the contestants in the game show Let's Make a Deal) such as turkey suits, hockey uniforms with mullets, Chewbacca outfits, or formal wedding wear while racing. Former Headmen from Camp Pathfinder have portaged 16 foot wooden and canvas canoes the entire length of the race. Due to limited capacity because of the Coronavirus pandemic of 2020, each of the 125 runners had to pay a $1,000 entry fee to participate. The entry fee for 2021 ranges from $37 to $42, depending on the date of registration.

References

See also
World's Largest Disco
Dallas Turkey Trot, the Buffalo Turkey Trot's cousin

Recurring events established in 1896
Thanksgiving (United States)
Turkey Trot